Dinanath Ramnarine (born June 4, 1975) is a Trinidadian cricketer who retired in 2002.

He was a leg-spin bowler who retired at an early age (28 years). He has a Test bowling average of around 30, taking 45 wickets in his 12 test matches, which is better when compared to most who would have played the same number of matches. After his premature retirement, he went on to successfully lead the West Indies Players Association (WIPA) with tremendous passion and gain the respect of all by winning 15 out of 15 Arbitration matters against the WICB. Among his other major accomplishments was the signing of the first Collective Agreement between WIPA and WICB, starting the Annual Player Awards Function and establishing a development program known as the "WIPA in the Community" where as much 10,000 kids to date have participated using cricket to teach valuable life skills. He further established a personal development program for which 150 first class players benefited. Mr. Ramnarine will be forever known as the "players champion" and a no-nonsense man who stands for integrity and good governance in sports.

On 21 August 2021, he was appointed as the team advisor for Trinbago Knight Riders for the 2021 Caribbean Premier League season.

FICA
He is a board member of the Federation of International Cricketers' Associations.

References

1975 births
Living people
West Indies One Day International cricketers
West Indies Test cricketers
Trinidad and Tobago cricketers
Trinidad and Tobago people of Indian descent